Kevin Hawley (born 30 July 1980) is an Anguillan former football player who played for the Anguilla national team. He is currently the vice president of the Anguilla Football Association.

National team statistics

References

External links

1980 births
Living people
Anguillan footballers
Association football defenders
Anguilla international footballers